ML Happy was an ill-fated ferry that sunk near Barisal City, Bangladesh on 19 February 2009. At least 39 people died in the sinking.

References

Ferries of Bangladesh
Maritime incidents in Bangladesh
Shipwrecks in rivers
Maritime incidents in 2009
2009 in Bangladesh
2009 disasters in Bangladesh